Pellegrini Partido is a partido on the western border of Buenos Aires Province in Argentina.

Name
The Partido is named in honour of Carlos Pellegrini, who served as Governor of Buenos Aires, and as President of Argentina.

Settlements
 Pellegrini
 De Bary
 Bocayuva

External links
 Pellegrini Website (Spanish)
Photos of Pellegrini City (Spanish)

1899 establishments in Argentina
Partidos of Buenos Aires Province